Tso Hok Young (born 29 February 1932) is a Hong Kong sports shooter. He competed in the mixed skeet event at the 1976 Summer Olympics.

References

External links
 

1932 births
Living people
Hong Kong male sport shooters
Olympic shooters of Hong Kong
Shooters at the 1976 Summer Olympics
Place of birth missing (living people)